Bondar Ziaratgah (also Romanized as Bondar Zīāratgāh) is a village in Hoseynabad-e Goruh Rural District, Rayen District, Kerman County, Kerman Province, Iran. At the 2006 census, its population was 15, in 5 families.

References 

Populated places in Kerman County